Alex Panamá (8 May 1940 – 13 September 2010) was a Salvadoran composer of contemporary classical music. He mainly composed orchestral music. Born in Santa Ana, El Salvador, and raised by his mother after the death of his father a few months after his birth, Panamá always had an inclination to music. He studied music at the Juilliard School and in Europe where his teachers included Nadia Boulanger and Pierre Boulez. He also had a flirtation with a conducting career, directing concerts in El Salvador in the late 1950s and early 1960s. His main collaborators in performing his works were Salvadoran composer and conductor German Cáceres, Mexican composer and conductor Manuel de Elías, and Salvadoran guitarist Walter Quevedo. His main classical music works included Destellos de una Vida and a novel called Pocos Minutos Antes de las Nueve de la Noche. Alex Panamá died on September 13th, 2010.

References

External links
 http://www.elfaro.net/es/201207/guiacultural/9128/
 https://www.youtube.com/playlist?list=PLXhIVpZQoorfeQ4oKucnlTHEG3lAmiSD7

Salvadoran composers
Male composers
1940 births
2010 deaths
Juilliard School alumni
Salvadoran expatriates in the United States